"Peg o' My Heart" is a popular song written by Alfred Bryan (words) and Fred Fisher (music). It was published on March 15, 1913 and it featured in the 1913 musical Ziegfeld Follies.

The song was first performed publicly by Irving Kaufman in 1912 at The College Inn in New York City after he had stumbled across a draft of sheet music on a shelf at the Leo Feist offices. 

The song was inspired by the main character in the very successful Broadway play of the time, Peg o' My Heart, that debuted December 20, 1912 at the Cort Theatre in NYC.  The play was written by J. Hartley Manners and starred Laurette Taylor in the title role. Taylor appeared on the cover of early published sheet music.

Notable recordings
Notable recordings of the song include:

Charles W. Harrison
Label: Victor 17412 (matrix: 13628-2)
Recorded: July 24, 1913
Henry Burr
Label: Columbia A-1404 (matrix: 38980-2)
Recorded: August 1, 1913
Walter Van Brunt
Edison, Blue Amberol 2036
Released: September 1913 
Bunny Berigan & his Orchestra
Label: Victor 27258 (matrix: 043925)
Recorded: New York City November 28, 1939
Lester Young Trio
Label: Clef MGC 135 (matrix: 353-1)
Released: 1953
Recorded: Hollywood April 1946
The Harmonicats
Label: Vitacoustic Records 1
Released: March 1947
First entered the Billboard magazine chart on April 18, on charts 21 weeks, peaking at #1
Buddy Clark with orchestra directed by Mitchell Ayres
Label: Columbia 37392 (matrix: CO 37671)
Recorded: New York City April 25, 1947
First entered the Billboard magazine chart on June 27, on charts 7 weeks, peaking at #4
Art Lund with orchestra conducted by Johnny Thompson
Label: MGM 10037 (matrix: 47-S-3077-3)
Recorded: in Los Angeles, California May 12, 1947
First entered the Billboard magazine chart on June 20, on charts 10 weeks, peaking at #6
Clark Dennis
Label: Capitol 346
First entered the Billboard magazine chart on July 4, 1947, on charts 1 week, at #10
The Three Suns
Label: RCA Victor 20-2272
First entered the Billboard magazine chart on June 20, 1947, on charts 16 weeks, peaking at #2
Joe Loss and his Orchestra
Label: His Master's Voice BD 5987
Recorded: London on October 13, 1947
Gene Vincent and His Bluecaps
Album: Bluejean Bop!
Label: Capitol Records
Released: 13 August 1956
Robert Maxwell His Harp and Orchestra
Released 1964: #64 on the US, Hot 100
Andy Williams
Album: The Shadow of Your Smile (1966)
Celtic punk band Dropkick Murphys covered the song on their 2011 album, Going Out in Style. Their version features a guest appearance by Bruce Springsteen.

In other media
"Peg o' My Heart" featured in the 1959 film Oh, You Beautiful Doll, a fictionalized biography of Fred Fisher, a German-born American writer of Tin Pan Alley songs. (Mark Stevens) turns serious composer Fred Breitenbach (S. Z. Sakall) into songwriter Fred Fisher. Fred Fisher is his assumed name in real life and Breitenbach is his birth surname. In the film, many Fisher songs were given a symphonic arrangement that was performed at Aeolian Hall. Among the other Fisher songs heard were "Chicago," "Dardanella," and "Who Paid the Rent for Mrs. Rip Van Winkle". Mark Stevens (dubbed by Bill Shirley) and June Haver (dubbed by Bonnie Lou Williams) sing "Peg o' My Heart" as a duet. The film was released on November 11, 1949.

The song, performed by Max Harris and his Novelty Trio (based on the Harmonicats' 1947 version), was used as the theme of the BBC miniseries The Singing Detective (1986).  When recording engineer Bill Putnam recorded the Harmonicats' version of the song, he utilized the bathroom of Universal Recording as an echo chamber and became the first person to use artificial reverberation creatively on a pop recording.

In the 2010 ITV drama Downton Abbey, episode 4 season 1 features William, the second footman, playing "Peg o' My Heart" on the piano in the servants' hall.

References

1913 songs
Andy Williams songs
Bruce Springsteen songs
Dropkick Murphys songs
Grammy Hall of Fame Award recipients
Number-one singles in the United States
Songs with lyrics by Alfred Bryan
Songs written by Fred Fisher